Jacob Marsham (28 February 1759 – 28 January 1840) was an English cleric, Canon of Windsor from 1805 to 1840.

Life

Marsham was born on 28 February 1759, the son of Robert Marsham, 2nd Baron Romney. He was educated at Eton College, entered Christ Church, Oxford in 1777, and then entered King's College, Cambridge in 1783, graduating M.A. in 1783 and D.D. in 1797.

Marsham was a prebendary of Bath and Wells in 1789, and prebendary of Rochester from 1797 to 1840. He was installed as rector of St Michael and All Angels' Church, Wilmington, Kent in 1800.

In 1805 Marsham was appointed canon of the twelfth stall in St George's Chapel, Windsor Castle in the place of Edward Legge who had been appointed dean.

Family
Marsham married in 1784 Amelia Frances Bullock.

Notes 

1759 births
1840 deaths
People educated at Eton College
Alumni of Christ Church, Oxford
Alumni of King's College, Cambridge
Canons of Windsor
Younger sons of barons